Union or Union City is a small census-designated place in Mason County, Washington, United States.  The community lies along the southern shore of the Great Bend of the Hood Canal, near the mouth of the Skokomish River, which flows from the nearby Olympic Mountains. The U.S. Census reported a population of 631 inhabitants in the 2010 census. The ZIP Code for Union is 98592.

State Route 106 is the main route through Union, leading to Belfair farther north, and Potlatch and US Highway 101 to the south.

History

The Hood Canal basin is the indigenous territory of several neighboring Native American communities, including the Skokomish and Squaxin peoples.

In the 1830s, white fur traders built a blockhouse on the bluff where Union. Settlers arrived in the area in the 1840s, with the future Union City site being claimed in 1852 by Thomas Webb or Wells. The town of Union was founded and named in 1858 by merchants Willson and Anderson. 

In 1889, logging pioneer John McReavy platted Union City on Hood Canal's south shore. The area's logging operations worked at an unprecedented scale to supply the expansionist ethos of Manifest Destiny. Dozens of mills sent timber to the booming California goldfields and for the construction of the Panama Canal. The generation that followed McReavy's drew inspiration from the surrounding landscape. Union society circulated around Olympus Manor, an artist colony that prospered until 1952 when the manor burned. It was the first non-native artist colony in Washington.

Union City was envisioned as the western terminus of a transcontinental railroad but the project was abandoned by the Union Pacific Railroad after the Panic of 1893.

Climate
This region experiences warm (but not hot) and dry summers, with no average monthly temperatures above 71.6 °F.  According to the Köppen Climate Classification system, Union has a warm-summer Mediterranean climate, abbreviated "Csb" on climate maps.

Arts and culture

Local attractions include a working farm and roadside market, a golf course, marinas and public boat launch sites, and the deep saltwater fjord of Hood Canal. Visitors come to the area for activities including boating, fishing, hunting, shellfishing, sea kayaking and birding. 

In 2010, Union was named one of America's twenty prettiest towns by Forbes Traveler.

Parks and recreation

In 1938, President Franklin D. Roosevelt designated the nearby wilderness of the Olympic Mountains a national park. The area is now an International Biosphere Reserve and a World Heritage Site. The mountains in the southeast corner of the park, Mount Washington, Mount Constance and the Brothers, rise across Hood Canal and can be seen from almost any point in Union.

References

External links

Union Visitor Information
Official Mason County Communities Guide

Census-designated places in Mason County, Washington
Census-designated places in Washington (state)